Electoral districts of Ukraine (a.k.a. single-mandate constituencies) — territorial units of election organization and parliamentary representation in Ukraine. Typically, electoral districts cover several administrative districts of an oblast or the Autonomous Republic of Crimea, or a medium-sized city or a part of a large city. They consist of electoral precincts (usually about one hundred of them in each electoral district), which are territorial units of election organization one level lower, and which have the size of several communities or village councils in rural areas or several neighborhoods in cities.

The next election to the Verkhovna Rada (set to be in 2023) will be (for the first time) with different regional open lists (with again an electoral threshold of five percent) and a return (and thus an abolishment of the constituencies with first-past-the-post voting) to only one national constituency.

In the 2019 Ukrainian parliamentary election Ukraine used the mixed electoral system for the elections of people's deputies, 225 deputies were elected to the Verkhovna Rada of Ukraine by the proportional electoral system (party lists) and 225 by the first-past-the-post electoral system.

On presidential elections and for proportional part of parliamentary elections, electoral districts are intermediate links of aggregation of voting results. After the counting of ballots, precinct election commissions determine the results of voting at their precincts. Thereafter, district election commissions determine the results of voting within their electoral districts by summing up the results from all the polling stations belonging to the district. The Central Election Commission then sums up the results of all electoral districts, including the Foreign one, to determine the final results of the voting. In addition to votes counting, district election commissions also deal with many other organizational issues within their electoral districts, including appointing the personal composition of precinct election commissions.

As a result of the Russian armed aggression against Ukraine, starting from 2014 elections have not been held in any of the electoral districts of the Autonomous Republic of Crimea and the city of Sevastopol (constituencies number 1-10, 224 and 225), in some electoral districts of Donetsk and Luhansk oblasts (collectively known as Donbas) completely (constituencies number 41-44, 53–56, 61, 104 and 108–111) or partly (counties number 45, 46, 51, 52, 59, 60, 105-107 and 112–114). As a result, there were vacant seats in the 8th and 9th convocations of the Verkhovna Rada, which should have been occupied by majority MPs from the electoral districts in Crimea and in Donbas.

Formation of electoral districts 
Electoral districts in their modern form were created on April 28, 2012, by the resolution of the Central Election Commission #82 (up to that moment there was a different system of electoral districts). Initially, they were intended to be used only for parliamentary elections, but in 2019 they were also applied for the presidential election. Different system of electoral districts was used in the 2014 presidential election. The current electoral districts system in theory can be applied to all-Ukrainian referendums, but in practice, no referendums have been held in Ukraine since 2000. The current electoral districts system was used in 2012 parliamentary election, 2014 parliamentary election, 2019 presidential election and 2019 parliamentary election.

The electoral districts were formed in a way that the voters were distributed among them as evenly as possible. The law stipulates that the deviation of the number of voters in the electoral district from the national average should not exceed 12%. At the time of electoral districts formation in 2012, this average was 161,125 voters. The law also stipulates that each electoral district must be within one administrative unit of the first level (oblast, city of Kyiv or Sevastopol, Autonomous Republic of Crimea), i.e. it is not allowed for a part of an electoral district to be in one administrative unit and another part in another unit. In addition, territories inhabited by national minorities and adjacent to each other must be included into one electoral district. Referring to this provision, the Hungarian national minority in Zakarpattia Oblast demands the restoration of Tisza electoral district, which existed prior to 2012, but in 2012 the Hungarians were divided between 73rd, 68th and 69th electoral districts, where they now are the minority of voters, which deprived them of the ability to elect their own deputy to the Verkhovna Rada. They have been denied every time, so the Zakarpattia Hungarian Culture Society since 2014 was threatening to sue Ukrainian government in the ECHR for refusing to set up an electoral district that would include territories of compact ethnic Hungarian habitation.

Foreign electoral district 

The Foreign electoral district of Ukraine is an electoral district, which unites electoral precincts, that are situated outside of the territory of Ukraine, and which comprises all polling station located inside embassies and consulates of Ukraine and inside military bases abroad, where there are Ukrainian peacekeeping contingents. Foreign electoral precincts, unlike usual ones which usually comprise several administrative districts in Ukraine, are much bigger in size. They comprise territories of countries, the whole or a part, or even parts of continents. In the Foreign electoral district there vote those Ukrainian citizens, who on the day of voting are living or just travelling abroad. Foreign district has many differences from usual electoral districts on the territory of Ukraine, but the fundamental difference is that it only aggregates votes cast abroad and do not bear the function of parliamentary representation, since majoritarian deputies are not elected there. Also, the Foreign district does not have its own district election commission, its duties are carried out by the Central Election Commission. As of 31 March 2019 there were 552,357 citizens in the lists of voters of the Foreign electoral district.

List 
 - electoral districts completely not under government control
 - electoral districts partially not under government control

Map 
[
 {"type": "ExternalData", "service": "page", "title": "Ukrainian_electoral_district_1.map"},
 {"type": "ExternalData", "service": "page", "title": "Ukrainian_electoral_district_2.map"},
 {"type": "ExternalData", "service": "page", "title": "Ukrainian_electoral_district_3.map"},
 {"type": "ExternalData", "service": "page", "title": "Ukrainian_electoral_district_4.map"},
 {"type": "ExternalData", "service": "page", "title": "Ukrainian_electoral_district_5.map"},
 {"type": "ExternalData", "service": "page", "title": "Ukrainian_electoral_district_6.map"},
 {"type": "ExternalData", "service": "page", "title": "Ukrainian_electoral_district_7.map"},
 {"type": "ExternalData", "service": "page", "title": "Ukrainian_electoral_district_8.map"},
 {"type": "ExternalData", "service": "page", "title": "Ukrainian_electoral_district_9.map"},
 {"type": "ExternalData", "service": "page", "title": "Ukrainian_electoral_district_10.map"},
 {"type": "ExternalData", "service": "page", "title": "Ukrainian_electoral_district_11.map"},
 {"type": "ExternalData", "service": "page", "title": "Ukrainian_electoral_district_12.map"},
 {"type": "ExternalData", "service": "page", "title": "Ukrainian_electoral_district_13.map"},
 {"type": "ExternalData", "service": "page", "title": "Ukrainian_electoral_district_14.map"},
 {"type": "ExternalData", "service": "page", "title": "Ukrainian_electoral_district_15.map"},
 {"type": "ExternalData", "service": "page", "title": "Ukrainian_electoral_district_16.map"},
 {"type": "ExternalData", "service": "page", "title": "Ukrainian_electoral_district_17.map"},
 {"type": "ExternalData", "service": "page", "title": "Ukrainian_electoral_district_18.map"},
 {"type": "ExternalData", "service": "page", "title": "Ukrainian_electoral_district_19.map"},
 {"type": "ExternalData", "service": "page", "title": "Ukrainian_electoral_district_20.map"},
 {"type": "ExternalData", "service": "page", "title": "Ukrainian_electoral_district_21.map"},
 {"type": "ExternalData", "service": "page", "title": "Ukrainian_electoral_district_22.map"},
 {"type": "ExternalData", "service": "page", "title": "Ukrainian_electoral_district_23.map"},
 {"type": "ExternalData", "service": "page", "title": "Ukrainian_electoral_district_24.map"},
 {"type": "ExternalData", "service": "page", "title": "Ukrainian_electoral_district_25.map"},
 {"type": "ExternalData", "service": "page", "title": "Ukrainian_electoral_district_26.map"},
 {"type": "ExternalData", "service": "page", "title": "Ukrainian_electoral_district_27.map"},
 {"type": "ExternalData", "service": "page", "title": "Ukrainian_electoral_district_28.map"},
 {"type": "ExternalData", "service": "page", "title": "Ukrainian_electoral_district_29.map"},
 {"type": "ExternalData", "service": "page", "title": "Ukrainian_electoral_district_30.map"},
 {"type": "ExternalData", "service": "page", "title": "Ukrainian_electoral_district_31.map"},
 {"type": "ExternalData", "service": "page", "title": "Ukrainian_electoral_district_32.map"},
 {"type": "ExternalData", "service": "page", "title": "Ukrainian_electoral_district_33.map"},
 {"type": "ExternalData", "service": "page", "title": "Ukrainian_electoral_district_34.map"},
 {"type": "ExternalData", "service": "page", "title": "Ukrainian_electoral_district_35.map"},
 {"type": "ExternalData", "service": "page", "title": "Ukrainian_electoral_district_36.map"},
 {"type": "ExternalData", "service": "page", "title": "Ukrainian_electoral_district_37.map"},
 {"type": "ExternalData", "service": "page", "title": "Ukrainian_electoral_district_38.map"},
 {"type": "ExternalData", "service": "page", "title": "Ukrainian_electoral_district_39.map"},
 {"type": "ExternalData", "service": "page", "title": "Ukrainian_electoral_district_40.map"},
 {"type": "ExternalData", "service": "page", "title": "Ukrainian_electoral_district_41.map"},
 {"type": "ExternalData", "service": "page", "title": "Ukrainian_electoral_district_42.map"},
 {"type": "ExternalData", "service": "page", "title": "Ukrainian_electoral_district_43.map"},
 {"type": "ExternalData", "service": "page", "title": "Ukrainian_electoral_district_44.map"},
 {"type": "ExternalData", "service": "page", "title": "Ukrainian_electoral_district_45.map"},
 {"type": "ExternalData", "service": "page", "title": "Ukrainian_electoral_district_46.map"},
 {"type": "ExternalData", "service": "page", "title": "Ukrainian_electoral_district_47.map"},
 {"type": "ExternalData", "service": "page", "title": "Ukrainian_electoral_district_48.map"},
 {"type": "ExternalData", "service": "page", "title": "Ukrainian_electoral_district_49.map"},
 {"type": "ExternalData", "service": "page", "title": "Ukrainian_electoral_district_50.map"},
 {"type": "ExternalData", "service": "page", "title": "Ukrainian_electoral_district_51.map"},
 {"type": "ExternalData", "service": "page", "title": "Ukrainian_electoral_district_52.map"},
 {"type": "ExternalData", "service": "page", "title": "Ukrainian_electoral_district_53.map"},
 {"type": "ExternalData", "service": "page", "title": "Ukrainian_electoral_district_54.map"},
 {"type": "ExternalData", "service": "page", "title": "Ukrainian_electoral_district_55.map"},
 {"type": "ExternalData", "service": "page", "title": "Ukrainian_electoral_district_56.map"},
 {"type": "ExternalData", "service": "page", "title": "Ukrainian_electoral_district_57.map"},
 {"type": "ExternalData", "service": "page", "title": "Ukrainian_electoral_district_58.map"},
 {"type": "ExternalData", "service": "page", "title": "Ukrainian_electoral_district_59.map"},
 {"type": "ExternalData", "service": "page", "title": "Ukrainian_electoral_district_60.map"},
 {"type": "ExternalData", "service": "page", "title": "Ukrainian_electoral_district_61.map"},
 {"type": "ExternalData", "service": "page", "title": "Ukrainian_electoral_district_62.map"},
 {"type": "ExternalData", "service": "page", "title": "Ukrainian_electoral_district_63.map"},
 {"type": "ExternalData", "service": "page", "title": "Ukrainian_electoral_district_64.map"},
 {"type": "ExternalData", "service": "page", "title": "Ukrainian_electoral_district_65.map"},
 {"type": "ExternalData", "service": "page", "title": "Ukrainian_electoral_district_66.map"},
 {"type": "ExternalData", "service": "page", "title": "Ukrainian_electoral_district_67.map"},
 {"type": "ExternalData", "service": "page", "title": "Ukrainian_electoral_district_68.map"},
 {"type": "ExternalData", "service": "page", "title": "Ukrainian_electoral_district_69.map"},
 {"type": "ExternalData", "service": "page", "title": "Ukrainian_electoral_district_70.map"},
 {"type": "ExternalData", "service": "page", "title": "Ukrainian_electoral_district_71.map"},
 {"type": "ExternalData", "service": "page", "title": "Ukrainian_electoral_district_72.map"},
 {"type": "ExternalData", "service": "page", "title": "Ukrainian_electoral_district_73.map"},
 {"type": "ExternalData", "service": "page", "title": "Ukrainian_electoral_district_74.map"},
 {"type": "ExternalData", "service": "page", "title": "Ukrainian_electoral_district_75.map"},
 {"type": "ExternalData", "service": "page", "title": "Ukrainian_electoral_district_76.map"},
 {"type": "ExternalData", "service": "page", "title": "Ukrainian_electoral_district_77.map"},
 {"type": "ExternalData", "service": "page", "title": "Ukrainian_electoral_district_78.map"},
 {"type": "ExternalData", "service": "page", "title": "Ukrainian_electoral_district_79.map"},
 {"type": "ExternalData", "service": "page", "title": "Ukrainian_electoral_district_80.map"},
 {"type": "ExternalData", "service": "page", "title": "Ukrainian_electoral_district_81.map"},
 {"type": "ExternalData", "service": "page", "title": "Ukrainian_electoral_district_82.map"},
 {"type": "ExternalData", "service": "page", "title": "Ukrainian_electoral_district_83.map"},
 {"type": "ExternalData", "service": "page", "title": "Ukrainian_electoral_district_84.map"},
 {"type": "ExternalData", "service": "page", "title": "Ukrainian_electoral_district_85.map"},
 {"type": "ExternalData", "service": "page", "title": "Ukrainian_electoral_district_86.map"},
 {"type": "ExternalData", "service": "page", "title": "Ukrainian_electoral_district_87.map"},
 {"type": "ExternalData", "service": "page", "title": "Ukrainian_electoral_district_88.map"},
 {"type": "ExternalData", "service": "page", "title": "Ukrainian_electoral_district_89.map"},
 {"type": "ExternalData", "service": "page", "title": "Ukrainian_electoral_district_90.map"},
 {"type": "ExternalData", "service": "page", "title": "Ukrainian_electoral_district_91.map"},
 {"type": "ExternalData", "service": "page", "title": "Ukrainian_electoral_district_92.map"},
 {"type": "ExternalData", "service": "page", "title": "Ukrainian_electoral_district_93.map"},
 {"type": "ExternalData", "service": "page", "title": "Ukrainian_electoral_district_94.map"},
 {"type": "ExternalData", "service": "page", "title": "Ukrainian_electoral_district_95.map"},
 {"type": "ExternalData", "service": "page", "title": "Ukrainian_electoral_district_96.map"},
 {"type": "ExternalData", "service": "page", "title": "Ukrainian_electoral_district_97.map"},
 {"type": "ExternalData", "service": "page", "title": "Ukrainian_electoral_district_98.map"},
 {"type": "ExternalData", "service": "page", "title": "Ukrainian_electoral_district_99.map"},
 {"type": "ExternalData", "service": "page", "title": "Ukrainian_electoral_district_100.map"},
 {"type": "ExternalData", "service": "page", "title": "Ukrainian_electoral_district_101.map"},
 {"type": "ExternalData", "service": "page", "title": "Ukrainian_electoral_district_102.map"},
 {"type": "ExternalData", "service": "page", "title": "Ukrainian_electoral_district_103.map"},
 {"type": "ExternalData", "service": "page", "title": "Ukrainian_electoral_district_104.map"},
 {"type": "ExternalData", "service": "page", "title": "Ukrainian_electoral_district_105.map"},
 {"type": "ExternalData", "service": "page", "title": "Ukrainian_electoral_district_106.map"},
 {"type": "ExternalData", "service": "page", "title": "Ukrainian_electoral_district_107.map"},
 {"type": "ExternalData", "service": "page", "title": "Ukrainian_electoral_district_108.map"},
 {"type": "ExternalData", "service": "page", "title": "Ukrainian_electoral_district_109.map"},
 {"type": "ExternalData", "service": "page", "title": "Ukrainian_electoral_district_110.map"},
 {"type": "ExternalData", "service": "page", "title": "Ukrainian_electoral_district_111.map"},
 {"type": "ExternalData", "service": "page", "title": "Ukrainian_electoral_district_112.map"},
 {"type": "ExternalData", "service": "page", "title": "Ukrainian_electoral_district_113.map"},
 {"type": "ExternalData", "service": "page", "title": "Ukrainian_electoral_district_114.map"},
 {"type": "ExternalData", "service": "page", "title": "Ukrainian_electoral_district_115.map"},
 {"type": "ExternalData", "service": "page", "title": "Ukrainian_electoral_district_116.map"},
 {"type": "ExternalData", "service": "page", "title": "Ukrainian_electoral_district_117.map"},
 {"type": "ExternalData", "service": "page", "title": "Ukrainian_electoral_district_118.map"},
 {"type": "ExternalData", "service": "page", "title": "Ukrainian_electoral_district_119.map"},
 {"type": "ExternalData", "service": "page", "title": "Ukrainian_electoral_district_120.map"},
 {"type": "ExternalData", "service": "page", "title": "Ukrainian_electoral_district_121.map"},
 {"type": "ExternalData", "service": "page", "title": "Ukrainian_electoral_district_122.map"},
 {"type": "ExternalData", "service": "page", "title": "Ukrainian_electoral_district_123.map"},
 {"type": "ExternalData", "service": "page", "title": "Ukrainian_electoral_district_124.map"},
 {"type": "ExternalData", "service": "page", "title": "Ukrainian_electoral_district_125.map"},
 {"type": "ExternalData", "service": "page", "title": "Ukrainian_electoral_district_126.map"},
 {"type": "ExternalData", "service": "page", "title": "Ukrainian_electoral_district_127.map"},
 {"type": "ExternalData", "service": "page", "title": "Ukrainian_electoral_district_128.map"},
 {"type": "ExternalData", "service": "page", "title": "Ukrainian_electoral_district_129.map"},
 {"type": "ExternalData", "service": "page", "title": "Ukrainian_electoral_district_130.map"},
 {"type": "ExternalData", "service": "page", "title": "Ukrainian_electoral_district_131.map"},
 {"type": "ExternalData", "service": "page", "title": "Ukrainian_electoral_district_132.map"},
 {"type": "ExternalData", "service": "page", "title": "Ukrainian_electoral_district_133.map"},
 {"type": "ExternalData", "service": "page", "title": "Ukrainian_electoral_district_134.map"},
 {"type": "ExternalData", "service": "page", "title": "Ukrainian_electoral_district_135.map"},
 {"type": "ExternalData", "service": "page", "title": "Ukrainian_electoral_district_136.map"},
 {"type": "ExternalData", "service": "page", "title": "Ukrainian_electoral_district_137.map"},
 {"type": "ExternalData", "service": "page", "title": "Ukrainian_electoral_district_138.map"},
 {"type": "ExternalData", "service": "page", "title": "Ukrainian_electoral_district_139.map"},
 {"type": "ExternalData", "service": "page", "title": "Ukrainian_electoral_district_140.map"},
 {"type": "ExternalData", "service": "page", "title": "Ukrainian_electoral_district_141.map"},
 {"type": "ExternalData", "service": "page", "title": "Ukrainian_electoral_district_142.map"},
 {"type": "ExternalData", "service": "page", "title": "Ukrainian_electoral_district_143.map"},
 {"type": "ExternalData", "service": "page", "title": "Ukrainian_electoral_district_144.map"},
 {"type": "ExternalData", "service": "page", "title": "Ukrainian_electoral_district_145.map"},
 {"type": "ExternalData", "service": "page", "title": "Ukrainian_electoral_district_146.map"},
 {"type": "ExternalData", "service": "page", "title": "Ukrainian_electoral_district_147.map"},
 {"type": "ExternalData", "service": "page", "title": "Ukrainian_electoral_district_148.map"},
 {"type": "ExternalData", "service": "page", "title": "Ukrainian_electoral_district_149.map"},
 {"type": "ExternalData", "service": "page", "title": "Ukrainian_electoral_district_150.map"},
 {"type": "ExternalData", "service": "page", "title": "Ukrainian_electoral_district_151.map"},
 {"type": "ExternalData", "service": "page", "title": "Ukrainian_electoral_district_152.map"},
 {"type": "ExternalData", "service": "page", "title": "Ukrainian_electoral_district_153.map"},
 {"type": "ExternalData", "service": "page", "title": "Ukrainian_electoral_district_154.map"},
 {"type": "ExternalData", "service": "page", "title": "Ukrainian_electoral_district_155.map"},
 {"type": "ExternalData", "service": "page", "title": "Ukrainian_electoral_district_156.map"},
 {"type": "ExternalData", "service": "page", "title": "Ukrainian_electoral_district_157.map"},
 {"type": "ExternalData", "service": "page", "title": "Ukrainian_electoral_district_158.map"},
 {"type": "ExternalData", "service": "page", "title": "Ukrainian_electoral_district_159.map"},
 {"type": "ExternalData", "service": "page", "title": "Ukrainian_electoral_district_160.map"},
 {"type": "ExternalData", "service": "page", "title": "Ukrainian_electoral_district_161.map"},
 {"type": "ExternalData", "service": "page", "title": "Ukrainian_electoral_district_162.map"},
 {"type": "ExternalData", "service": "page", "title": "Ukrainian_electoral_district_163.map"},
 {"type": "ExternalData", "service": "page", "title": "Ukrainian_electoral_district_164.map"},
 {"type": "ExternalData", "service": "page", "title": "Ukrainian_electoral_district_165.map"},
 {"type": "ExternalData", "service": "page", "title": "Ukrainian_electoral_district_166.map"},
 {"type": "ExternalData", "service": "page", "title": "Ukrainian_electoral_district_167.map"},
 {"type": "ExternalData", "service": "page", "title": "Ukrainian_electoral_district_168.map"},
 {"type": "ExternalData", "service": "page", "title": "Ukrainian_electoral_district_169.map"},
 {"type": "ExternalData", "service": "page", "title": "Ukrainian_electoral_district_170.map"},
 {"type": "ExternalData", "service": "page", "title": "Ukrainian_electoral_district_171.map"},
 {"type": "ExternalData", "service": "page", "title": "Ukrainian_electoral_district_172.map"},
 {"type": "ExternalData", "service": "page", "title": "Ukrainian_electoral_district_173.map"},
 {"type": "ExternalData", "service": "page", "title": "Ukrainian_electoral_district_174.map"},
 {"type": "ExternalData", "service": "page", "title": "Ukrainian_electoral_district_175.map"},
 {"type": "ExternalData", "service": "page", "title": "Ukrainian_electoral_district_176.map"},
 {"type": "ExternalData", "service": "page", "title": "Ukrainian_electoral_district_177.map"},
 {"type": "ExternalData", "service": "page", "title": "Ukrainian_electoral_district_178.map"},
 {"type": "ExternalData", "service": "page", "title": "Ukrainian_electoral_district_179.map"},
 {"type": "ExternalData", "service": "page", "title": "Ukrainian_electoral_district_180.map"},
 {"type": "ExternalData", "service": "page", "title": "Ukrainian_electoral_district_181.map"},
 {"type": "ExternalData", "service": "page", "title": "Ukrainian_electoral_district_182.map"},
 {"type": "ExternalData", "service": "page", "title": "Ukrainian_electoral_district_183.map"},
 {"type": "ExternalData", "service": "page", "title": "Ukrainian_electoral_district_184.map"},
 {"type": "ExternalData", "service": "page", "title": "Ukrainian_electoral_district_185.map"},
 {"type": "ExternalData", "service": "page", "title": "Ukrainian_electoral_district_186.map"},
 {"type": "ExternalData", "service": "page", "title": "Ukrainian_electoral_district_187.map"},
 {"type": "ExternalData", "service": "page", "title": "Ukrainian_electoral_district_188.map"},
 {"type": "ExternalData", "service": "page", "title": "Ukrainian_electoral_district_189.map"},
 {"type": "ExternalData", "service": "page", "title": "Ukrainian_electoral_district_190.map"},
 {"type": "ExternalData", "service": "page", "title": "Ukrainian_electoral_district_191.map"},
 {"type": "ExternalData", "service": "page", "title": "Ukrainian_electoral_district_192.map"},
 {"type": "ExternalData", "service": "page", "title": "Ukrainian_electoral_district_193.map"},
 {"type": "ExternalData", "service": "page", "title": "Ukrainian_electoral_district_194.map"},
 {"type": "ExternalData", "service": "page", "title": "Ukrainian_electoral_district_195.map"},
 {"type": "ExternalData", "service": "page", "title": "Ukrainian_electoral_district_196.map"},
 {"type": "ExternalData", "service": "page", "title": "Ukrainian_electoral_district_197.map"},
 {"type": "ExternalData", "service": "page", "title": "Ukrainian_electoral_district_198.map"},
 {"type": "ExternalData", "service": "page", "title": "Ukrainian_electoral_district_199.map"},
 {"type": "ExternalData", "service": "page", "title": "Ukrainian_electoral_district_200.map"},
 {"type": "ExternalData", "service": "page", "title": "Ukrainian_electoral_district_201.map"},
 {"type": "ExternalData", "service": "page", "title": "Ukrainian_electoral_district_202.map"},
 {"type": "ExternalData", "service": "page", "title": "Ukrainian_electoral_district_203.map"},
 {"type": "ExternalData", "service": "page", "title": "Ukrainian_electoral_district_204.map"},
 {"type": "ExternalData", "service": "page", "title": "Ukrainian_electoral_district_205.map"},
 {"type": "ExternalData", "service": "page", "title": "Ukrainian_electoral_district_206.map"},
 {"type": "ExternalData", "service": "page", "title": "Ukrainian_electoral_district_207.map"},
 {"type": "ExternalData", "service": "page", "title": "Ukrainian_electoral_district_208.map"},
 {"type": "ExternalData", "service": "page", "title": "Ukrainian_electoral_district_209.map"},
 {"type": "ExternalData", "service": "page", "title": "Ukrainian_electoral_district_210.map"},
 {"type": "ExternalData", "service": "page", "title": "Ukrainian_electoral_district_211.map"},
 {"type": "ExternalData", "service": "page", "title": "Ukrainian_electoral_district_212.map"},
 {"type": "ExternalData", "service": "page", "title": "Ukrainian_electoral_district_213.map"},
 {"type": "ExternalData", "service": "page", "title": "Ukrainian_electoral_district_214.map"},
 {"type": "ExternalData", "service": "page", "title": "Ukrainian_electoral_district_215.map"},
 {"type": "ExternalData", "service": "page", "title": "Ukrainian_electoral_district_216.map"},
 {"type": "ExternalData", "service": "page", "title": "Ukrainian_electoral_district_217.map"},
 {"type": "ExternalData", "service": "page", "title": "Ukrainian_electoral_district_218.map"},
 {"type": "ExternalData", "service": "page", "title": "Ukrainian_electoral_district_219.map"},
 {"type": "ExternalData", "service": "page", "title": "Ukrainian_electoral_district_220.map"},
 {"type": "ExternalData", "service": "page", "title": "Ukrainian_electoral_district_221.map"},
 {"type": "ExternalData", "service": "page", "title": "Ukrainian_electoral_district_222.map"},
 {"type": "ExternalData", "service": "page", "title": "Ukrainian_electoral_district_223.map"},
 {"type": "ExternalData", "service": "page", "title": "Ukrainian_electoral_district_224.map"},
 {"type": "ExternalData", "service": "page", "title": "Ukrainian_electoral_district_225.map"}
]

See also 

 Electoral district
 Elections in Ukraine
 Foreign electoral district of Ukraine

Links 
 List of electoral districts of Ukraine by region on the website of the State Voters Register
 List of electoral districts of the 2019 parliamentary election on the website of the Central Election Commission

References 

 
Elections in Ukraine
Ukraine
Ukraine politics-related lists